Marjorie Dale Shapiro is an American experimental particle physicist, a collaborator on the ATLAS experiment, a faculty senior scientist at the Lawrence Berkeley National Laboratory, and a professor of physics at the University of California, Berkeley.

Education and career
Shapiro graduated magna cum laude from Harvard University in 1976, with a bachelor's degree in physics. She completed her Ph.D. in physics at the University of California, Berkeley in 1984.

After postdoctoral research at Harvard, she joined the Harvard University faculty as an assistant professor in 1987, and was Loeb Associate Professor there in 1989. She returned to Berkeley as a faculty member in 1990, and became affiliated with the Lawrence Berkeley National Laboratory as a faculty senior scientist in 1992. She was promoted to professor at Berkeley in 1994, and has served as department chair from 2004 to 2007.

Recognition
In 1992, Shapiro was named a Fellow of the American Physical Society (APS), after a nomination from the APS Division of Particles and Fields, "for contributions to the study of high-transverse-momentum phenomena in proton-antiproton collisions". She was elected in 2020 to the American Academy of Arts and Sciences.

References

External links
Home page
Oral history interview transcript with Marjorie Shapiro on 10 May 2021, American Institute of Physics, Niels Bohr Library & Archives

Year of birth missing (living people)
Living people
Harvard University alumni
University of California, Berkeley alumni
Harvard University faculty
University of California, Berkeley faculty
Lawrence Berkeley National Laboratory people
Fellows of the American Academy of Arts and Sciences
Fellows of the American Physical Society